Nuclear-inclusion-a endopeptidase (potyvirus NIa protease) is a protease enzyme found in potyviruses. This enzyme catalyses the following chemical reaction:

 Hydrolyses glutaminyl bonds, and activity is further restricted by preferences for the amino acids in P6 - P1' that vary with the species of potyvirus. 
 e.g. Glu-Xaa-Xaa-Tyr-Xaa-Gln \ (Ser or Gly) for the enzyme from tobacco etch virus.

The enzyme is used encoded in vectors for the artificial expression of recombinant fusion proteins (see TEV protease).

References

External links 
 

EC 3.4.22